Solocisquama  is a fish genus in the family Ogcocephalidae.

Species
There are currently three recognized species in this genus:
 Solocisquama carinata Bradbury, 1999
 Solocisquama erythrina C. H. Gilbert, 1905
 Solocisquama stellulata C. H. Gilbert, 1905

References

Ogcocephalidae
Marine fish genera